János Széles (1909 – 8 July 1981) was a Hungarian boxer. He competed in the men's bantamweight event at the 1928 Summer Olympics.

References

External links
 

1909 births
1981 deaths
Hungarian male boxers
Olympic boxers of Hungary
Boxers at the 1928 Summer Olympics
Martial artists from Budapest
Bantamweight boxers